The Forty-Eighth National Assembly was a convocation of the National Assembly of Bulgaria, formed according to the results of the early parliamentary elections in Bulgaria, held on 2 October 2022. It was dissolved by the President of Bulgaria on 3 February 2023.

Composition 
This list includes all current members of the 48 National Assembly.

References 

National Assembly (Bulgaria)
2022 establishments in Bulgaria
National Assembly of Bulgaria